is a farming simulation video game released in Japan on June 7, 2007 by Marvelous Interactive, in North America on September 30, 2008 by Natsume, and in the PAL region in October 2009. It was released for Nintendo's Wii console and was the first title in the Story of Seasons series originally developed for the Wii.

It was followed by a sequel, Harvest Moon: Animal Parade, a year later.

Story
The protagonist has moved to an island town called Waffle Island that was once enchanted. However, the sacred Mother Tree of the island has died, and the island's deity, the Harvest Goddess, has vanished. The island has lost its connection with nature and its inhabitants do not know what to do. By growing various crops and herbs, tending to and befriending animals, forming friendships, and raising a family, the protagonist can help save the island by bringing its tree back to life. Upon arriving and getting to know the villages, they begins their job on the island. Hamilton, the town's mayor, later gives them the left half of the Harvest Spite Quilt, believed to be connected to the Harvest Spites who live on the island, that has been in his family for generations, but has no clue where the right half is. After learning that the town's clock tower has been out of order for a long time, they try to fix it and discover the right half of the quilt stuck in its gears, having been hidden there by the Harvest Spites; removing it repairs the clock. The quilt reveals that Harvest Spites and sleeping under flowers near special trees. They awaken them one by one and help them create rainbows to other areas. In turn, they give the protagonist badges that allow them to cross the rainbows. They locate where the Mother Tree once was and after a telepathic communication with the Harvest Goddess, they learn that they must find the seedling of happiness to grow a new Mother Tree, which is revealed to be in the mayor's possession; he reluctantly lets the protagonist have it. After planting the seedling, it grows into the new Mother Tree and the protagonist and Harvest Spites perform a ritual at the top of the tree to bring the Harvest Goddess back, as she has been unable to return after the Mother Tree died. She thanks the protagonist before sending them back to the village, where the villagers congratulate them for their efforts.

Gameplay
Using tools more often around the farm, mine, and rivers and oceans, causes the player to become more proficient with them. This allows the player to till more plots of land with one hit, water multiple plots at once, cast to catch rarer fish, or strike a rock or tree with more strength while using less stamina. Depending on how much skill the player has, working on their garden or livestock can take the better part of a day. This is where being able to do more with less effort has an advantage.

There are new animals such as ostriches that players may buy. There are also pets the player can adopt, located at various places throughout the island. This is done by getting a sufficient amount of hearts from them, and then choosing to adopt them. However, players may only have a limited number of adopted pets on their farm at one time, so choices must be made wisely.

Marriage
Each gender of main character has 8 marriage candidates available. To get married, the player must raise the chosen person's heart level to 8 hearts. This is most easily done by going on dates, giving gifts or just talking to the person. Marriage is optional, but if the player chooses to do so, they'll have to find a blue feather to propose.

The player can choose when they want to get married. After the player is married, they will have a child. When the child becomes a toddler, the player may play with them. There will be special events in the child's life such as "First Steps", "Talking", "Reaching Teenager", and "Growing Up." However, your child never grows up past the stage of being a kid. Once your kid gets to the stage where you can ask him to do chores/go for a walk, he will not grow up anymore beyond this point. The player eventually receives the option to start the game over as their child.

The farm
When starting to play, the player will have a choice of three plots of land: hilltop, town, and seaside. Each plot varies in size and location. The plots are located in the same district, but spread apart.

Reception

The game received "mixed" reviews according to the review aggregation website Metacritic. In Japan, Famitsu gave it a score of 30 out of 40.

References

External links
 

2007 video games
Tree of Peace
Marvelous Entertainment
Video games developed in Japan
Video games featuring protagonists of selectable gender
Wii-only games
Wii games
Rising Star Games games
Multiplayer and single-player video games
Natsume (company) games